The France men's national ice hockey team has participated in the IIHF European Championships, the IIHF World Hockey Championships and the Olympic Games. As of 2016, it is ranked 14th in the world in the IIHF World Rankings. The team is overseen by the Fédération Française de Hockey sur Glace. Notable recent wins include upsets against Russia at the 2013 IIHF World Championship, Canada at the 2014 IIHF World Championship, and a triumphant 5–1 over Finland as the tournament host of 2017 IIHF World Championship.

Patrick Francheterre coached the national team in 1985 and 1986, then managed the team from 1993 to 1997 and from 2004 to 2014, and received the Paul Loicq Award in 2017.

Tournament record

Olympic Games

World Championship
See: Ice Hockey World Championships and List of IIHF World Championship medalists
Note: Between 1920 and 1968, the Olympic hockey tournament was also considered the World Championship for that year. World Championship tournaments were not held in the Olympic years of 1980, 1984, and 1988.

European Championship

Current roster
Roster for the 2022 IIHF World Championship.

Head coach: Philippe Bozon

Uniform evolution

References

External links

IIHF profile
National Teams of Ice Hockey

National ice hockey teams in Europe
Ice hockey in France
National sports teams of France